The Lupche-Savino is a river in the south of the Kola Peninsula in Murmansk Oblast, Russia. It is 22 km long. The Lupche-Savino originates in the Lake Bolshoye Savino, flows through the smaller Lake Lupche and discharges into the Lupcha Bay of Kandalaksha Gulf.

References

Rivers of Murmansk Oblast